The Charlotte County Sheriff's Office (CCSO) is a law enforcement agency in Charlotte County, Florida, headquartered at 7474 Utilities Road, Punta Gorda, Florida. The current sheriff is Bill Prummell, who was elected in 2012. The CCSO covers all of Charlotte County, including the City of Punta Gorda, where it shares jurisdiction with the Punta Gorda Police Department. The office also operates the Charlotte County Jail.

History

The Charlotte County Sheriff's Office was formed in 1921, when Florida Governor Cary A. Hardee appointed school teacher James H. Lipscomb as sheriff for the county; 16 men have served as Sheriff of Charlotte County to date. In its early days, much of its focus was on enforcing laws restricting the sale and use of alcohol under prohibition.

Charlotte County Jail
The current county jail is located at 26601 Airport Road in Punta Gorda, near the Punta Gorda Airport and the Charlotte campus of Florida SouthWestern State College. It was built in 2001 and has a capacity of 1,074. It is described by the sheriff's office as a "direct supervision jail," differing from conventional jails in that an officer is stationed within the housing unit. The sheriff's office and health provider Corizon Health have been criticized after numerous inmates have died in custody at the Charlotte County Jail and lawsuits were filed by the inmates' families.

Jurisdiction
The Charlotte County Sheriff's Office has jurisdiction throughout Charlotte County, which is divided into four districts. District 1 covers the area west of the Myakka River, including Boca Grande, Englewood, the Gulf Cove area of Port Charlotte, Knights Island, Little Gasparilla Island, Placida, and Rotonda West. District 2 covers the northwestern portion of Port Charlotte known as Murdock. District 3 covers the eastern portion of Port Charlotte from Midway Boulevard to Interstate 75, and from the Sarasota County line to Charlotte Harbor. District 4 covers the rest of Charlotte County, including Cleveland, Deep Creek, and Punta Gorda.

Notable cases

Denise Amber Lee

On January 17, 2008, Denise Amber Lee, who was 21 years old at the time of her death, was kidnapped from her home in North Port, Florida, and taken to Charlotte County where she was raped and murdered by an individual named Michael King. Numerous calls were placed to 9-1-1 emergency services in relation to the incident, some of which were routed to the Charlotte County Sheriff's Office. Notably, a 9-1-1 call was placed by Jane Kowalski, a woman from Tampa, Florida, who thought she was witnessing a child abduction while traveling on U.S. 41 in Port Charlotte, Florida. It has been argued that information provided by Kowalski could have saved Lee's life had the information been properly relayed to deputies in the field searching for Lee and her abductor. King was apprehended by the Florida Highway Patrol while turning onto Interstate 75 from Toledo Blade Blvd in North Port; Lee had been murdered and dumped in Charlotte County. This incident led to the passing of the Denise Amber Lee Act, which established additional training for 9-1-1 dispatchers in Florida.

References

Charlotte County, Florida
Sheriffs' departments of Florida
1921 establishments in Florida
Government agencies established in 1921